Ceramium diaphanum is a species of marine red algae (or Rhodophyta).

Description
This small filamentous alga grows attached, or unattached, in masses reaching 20 cm across. The branches grow pseudochotomously the tips are strongly coiled in. It is corticated only at the nodes between the axial cells and form clear cortical bands. The rhizoids are multicellular.

Reproduction
The full life history is not yet confirmed. Tetraspores have been recorded in groups on the nodes.

Habitat
Growing as attached or unattached clumps on other algae and Zostera at low littoral to 3 m deep.

Distribution
Widely distributed in Ireland, England and Scotland.Isle of Man. Reported from Norway and United States of America.

References

External links 
 

 
 Ceramium diaphanum at algaebase.org (retrieved 22 July 2016)

diaphanum
Species described in 1806